The Philippine Basketball Association (PBA) All-Rookie Team is an annual Philippine Basketball Association (PBA) honor given since the 2004–05 PBA season, to the top rookie(s) of the season in each of the five basketball positions: point guard, shooting guard (off-guard or big guard), small forward, power forward and center.

Unlike the traditional player awards, which is given by the league, this citation is awarded by the PBA Press Corps.

Selections

Notes

All-Rookie Team
Rookie player awards
Awards established in 2005
2005 establishments in the Philippines